KMAJ-FM, branded as Majic 107.7, is a radio station serving Topeka, Kansas and vicinity with an adult contemporary format. It operates on FM frequency 107.7 MHz and is under ownership of Cumulus Media.

History
KMAJ-FM signed on in 1971 as easy listening outlet KSWT "K-Sweet". The music all played from large 10-inch reels of tape, while the rest of the programming elements came from cart carousels within a Harris automation system. There was no "live" announcer in the early years.

In 1981, KSWT became KMAJ and rebranded as "Magic 108".

Each year, KMAJ plays Christmas music, 24/7 leading into the holiday. In 2013, it flipped earlier, starting it on the evening of the 15th, as the first station in Kansas to air the music during the holidays. In 2017 the station flipped on November 16. In 2020, during the pandemic, the station flipped all Christmas on November 10.

On-Air line up consists of Shawn Knight & Danielle Norwood "Knight & Norwood" host the Majic Morning Show. John Tesh has been in mid-days since 2015. Amber Lee currently does afternoons and has been on-air since 2014 and serves as Program Director of KMAJ-FM.

Long time morning hosts John Lee Hooker & Mike Manns retired in 2018 after 32 years on-air together.

See also
 KMAJ (AM)

References

External links
Official Site

Mainstream adult contemporary radio stations in the United States
MAJ-FM
Radio stations established in 1971
1971 establishments in Kansas
Cumulus Media radio stations